James Davy is the former Commissioner of Human Services in New Jersey, holding the position under former Governors James McGreevey and Jon Corzine.  He previously served on McGreevey's staff in the governor's office and while McGreevey was Mayor of Woodbridge Township.

On September 9, 2005, former Governor of New Jersey Richard Codey named his wife, Lucille Davy, as Acting Commissioner of Education.  In doing so, they became the first husband and wife to serve in a state cabinet together in the country. They reside in Pennington, New Jersey.

References

Living people
People from Pennington, New Jersey
State cabinet secretaries of New Jersey
Year of birth missing (living people)